Tone may refer to:

Color-related
 Tone (color theory), a mix of tint and shade, in painting and color theory
 Tone (color), the lightness or brightness (as well as darkness) of a colour
 Toning (coin), colour change in coins
 Photographic print toning, a process that changes the color of monochromatic film, e.g. sepia tone

Sound and music
 Tone (linguistics), the pitch and pitch changes in words of certain languages
 Tone (musical instrument), the audible characteristics of a musician's sound
 Musical tone, a sound characterized by its duration, pitch, intensity, and timbre
 Pure tone, a tone with a sinusoidal waveform
 Reciting tone, such as Psalm tone and recitative, as in Gregorian chants
 Tonality, a system of music based on a key "center", or tonic
 Tone control, a (typically electronic) control for affecting frequency content of an audio signal
 Whole tone, or major second, a commonly occurring musical interval

Musical genres, groups, people and works
 Tone (DC band), a DC instrumental band formed in 1991
 Tone (Jeff Ament album), a 2008 album by Jeff Ament
 Tone (TVXQ album), a 2011 album by Tohoshinki
 2 Tone (music genre) or Two Tone, style of music combining elements of ska and punk
 Tones (album), a 1986 album by Eric Johnson
 Yasunao Tone, Japanese-American experimental composer with Hi-Red Center, Fluxus, etc.

Places
 Tone, Gunma, Japan
 Tone, Ibaraki, Japan
 Tone, Somerset, England
 Tone River (disambiguation)

Physiology
 Muscle tone, the state of tension or responsiveness of the organs or tissues of the body
 Toning exercises, the use of exercise to develop hard, but not necessarily large, musculature tone

Other uses
 Tone (literature), a literary technique which encompasses the attitudes toward the subject and toward the audience implied in a literary work that is compatible with the other drive
 Tone (magazine), a New Zealand technology magazine
 Tone (name)
 Japanese ship Tone (pronounced "Toh-Neh"), three warships of Japan
 Tone policing, focusing on the emotion of a message rather than its content
 Tone's Spices, a brand owned by Associated British Foods

See also

Toine
Ton (disambiguation)
Tona (name)
 Tonal (disambiguation)
 Tonic (disambiguation)
Toney (disambiguation)
Tonie
 Tune (disambiguation)